Winter is one of the four temperate seasons.

Winter may also refer to:

Places
 Winter, Saskatchewan, Canada
 Winter, West Virginia
 Winter (town), Wisconsin, U.S.
 Winter, Wisconsin, U.S., a village within the town
 Winters, California, U.S.
 Winters, Michigan, U.S., a former post office in Rock River Township, Michigan
 Winters, Texas, U.S.
 Winter (MBTA station), a station in Downtown Crossing
 Winter Building, a historic building in Montgomery, Alabama, U.S.

People

Alias
 Winter (programmer) (born 1972), freelance software programmer and consultant
 Winter (wrestler) (born 1980), Katarina Waters, German-born English professional wrestler
 Winter (born 2001), Kim Min-jeong, member of South Korean girl group Aespa

Given name
 Winter (given name)
 Winter Hall (1872-1947), New Zealand actor
 Winter Charles Renouf (1868–1954), British philatelist
 Winter Vinecki (born 1998), American marathon runner
 Winter Ave Zoli (born 1980), American actress and model

Surname
 Winter (surname)
 Winters (name), a surname

Animals
 Winter (dolphin), a dolphin with a prosthetic tail, subject of the 2011 movie Dolphin Tale
 Winter (horse), a racehorse who won the 2017 1000 Guineas Stakes
 Winter (llama), a Belgian llama used in antibody research

Art, entertainment, and media

Fictional entities
 Winter, a character from Star Wars Expanded Universe
 Winter, a planet in Ursula K. Le Guin's novel The Left Hand of Darkness (1969)
 Winter (Star Wars), a character in the Star Wars universe
 Winter Anderson, from American Horror Story: Cult played by Billie Lourd
 Winter Santiaga, the main character in the 1999 novel The Coldest Winter Ever by Sister Souljah
 Winter Schnee, a minor character from the web series RWBY

Films
 Winter (1930 film), a Silly Symphonies animated Disney short
 Winter (2002 film), an Italian romance-drama film
 Winter (2009 film), a Malayalam horror film
 The Winter (2013 film), Greek film with Vangelis Mourikis
 El invierno, The Winter 2016 Argentine film

Literature
 "Winter" (poem), a poem by Mehdi Akhavan-Sales
 Winter, a 1974 book by Morley Callaghan
 Winter (Deighton novel), a 1987 novel by Len Deighton
 Winter (Marsden novel), a 2000 novel by John Marsden
 Winter (Meyer novel), a 2015 novel by Marissa Meyer
 Winter (Smith novel), a 2017 novel by Ali Smith
 Winter: Five Windows on the Season, the 2011 Massey Lectures by Adam Gopnik

Music

Groups and labels
 Winter (American band), a death/doom metal band
 Winter, an American pop band fronted by Samira Winter
 Winter & Winter Records, a record label

Albums
 Winter (Akdong Musician album), 2017
 Winter (New Model Army album), 2016
 Winter (Steeleye Span album), 2004
 Winter/Reflections, by Boyz II Men, 2005

EPs
 Winter (Jon Foreman EP), 2008
 Winter (MBLAQ EP), 2014
 Winter, by Subtle, 2002

Songs
 "Winter" (Amebix song), 1983
 "Winter" (Love and Money song), 1991
 "Winter" (Rolling Stones song), 1973
 "Winter" (Tori Amos song), 1992
 "Winter" (U2 song), 2009
 "Winter" (Unheilig song), 2010
 "Winter (Winter Rose / Duet)", by Tohoshinki, 2011
 "Winter", signature song of Iranian singer Afshin Moghaddam
 "Winter", by Bayside from Acoustic
 "Winter", by Benee from Hey U X, featuring Mallrat, 2020
 "Winter", by The Fall from Hex Enduction Hour
 "Winter", by Joshua Radin from We Were Here
 "Winter", by Judas Priest from Rocka Rolla
 "Winter", by K's Choice from The Great Subconscious Club
 "Winter", by Khalid from American Teen
 "Winter", by Teenage Fanclub from Songs from Northern Britain
 "Winter", by TV on the Radio from Seeds
 "Winter" ("L'inverno"), a concerto from Vivaldi's The Four Seasons

Other art, entertainment, and media
 Winter (TV series), a 2015 Australian television series that is a spin-off from telemovie The Killing Field
 Winter (video game), a survival horror game for the Wii
 Winter (Purvītis), a 1910 painting by Vilhelms Purvītis
 Winter (statue), a sculpture cast by Jean-Antoine Houdon

Other uses
 Winter (Fabergé egg), a jeweled Easter egg designed in 1913
 Winter, a complexion type in skin tone color matching
 Winter, the brand name of a 1900s British automobile manufactured by W.W.

See also
 
 
 :Category:Winter, Wikimedia category
 de Winter (surname)
 Midwinter (disambiguation)
 The Winter Album (disambiguation)
 Vinter (disambiguation)
 Winter solstice (disambiguation)
 Winter time (disambiguation)
 Wintertide (disambiguation)
 Wynter (disambiguation)
 Winters (disambiguation)
 Coldest winter (disambiguation)

English feminine given names